Presidium of the Reichstag (Nazi Germany) 

It consisted of the Reichtagspräsident, Erster Stellvertreter (First Deputy President), Zweiter Stellvertreter (Second Deputy President) and Dritter Stellvertreter (Third Deputy President)

1. Legislative Session (1933)

Presidium elected on March 12, 1933

2. Legislative Session (1933–1936)

Presidium elected on December 12, 1933

3. Legislative Session (1936–1939)

Presidium elected on January 30, 1937

4. Legislative Session (1939–1945)

Presidum elected on January 30, 1939

Sources

Political history of Germany
Reichstag